Clara Bimbocci (16 April 1919 – 28 April 2006) was an Italian gymnast. She competed in the women's artistic team all-around event at the 1936 Summer Olympics. Bimbocci died in Como on 28 April 2006, at the age of 87.

References

External links
 

1919 births
2006 deaths
Italian female artistic gymnasts
Olympic gymnasts of Italy
Gymnasts at the 1936 Summer Olympics
Sportspeople from Lucca